A hotwash is the immediate "after-action" discussions and evaluations of an agency's (or multiple agencies') performance following an exercise, training session, or major event, such as Hurricane Katrina.

The main purpose of a hotwash session is to identify strengths and weaknesses of the response to a given event, which then leads to another governmental phase known as "lessons learned." Hotwashes are intended to guide future responses in order to avoid repeating errors made in the past. A hotwash normally includes all the parties that participated in the exercise or response activities. These events are usually used to create the after action review/improvement plan.

Hotwash is a term picked up in recent years by the Emergency Preparedness Community, likely as a result of Homeland Security and other government agencies' involvement in disaster planning. It serves as a form of after-disaster briefing for all parties involved to analyze what worked well, what needs improvement, what person or agency needs to be responsible for said improvements, and the assignments and timelines for the noted corrective and proactive improvements to be in place.

Origin 
The term hotwash originated in the U.S. Army:

It is also commonly used in the Coast Guard and other seagoing services to describe the use of a fine spray mist of water and lubricants to prevent corrosion in helicopter turbines operated in a heavily saltwater-saturated marine environment.

References 

For an example of "hotwash" in the context of "TOP OFF 1" see 

Military terminology
Military education and training in the United States